In enzymology, a glyceraldehyde-3-phosphate dehydrogenase (NADP+) (phosphorylating) is an enzyme that catalyzes the chemical reaction

D-glyceraldehyde 3-phosphate + phosphate + NADP+  3-phospho-D-glyceroyl phosphate + NADPH + H+

The 3 substrates of this enzyme are D-glyceraldehyde 3-phosphate, phosphate, and NADP+, whereas its 3 products are 3-phospho-D-glyceroyl phosphate, NADPH, and H+.

Function 

This enzyme belongs to the family of oxidoreductases, specifically those acting on the aldehyde or oxo group of donor with NAD+ or NADP+ as acceptor.   This enzyme participates in the Calvin cycle which is an autotrophic carbon fixation pathway.

Nomenclature 

The systematic name of this enzyme class is D-glyceraldehyde-3-phosphate:NADP+ oxidoreductase (phosphorylating). Other names in common use include:
 dehydrogenase, glyceraldehyde phosphate (nicotinamide adenine dinucleotide phosphate) (phosphorylating)
 GAPDH
 glyceraldehyde phosphate dehydrogenase (nicotinamide adenine dinucleotide phosphate) (phosphorylating)
 glyceraldehyde-3-phosphate dehydrogenase (NADP) (phosphorylating)
 NADP-dependent glyceraldehyde phosphate dehydrogenase
 NADP-glyceraldehyde phosphate dehydrogenase
 NADP-glyceraldehyde-3-phosphate dehydrogenase
 NADP-triose phosphate dehydrogenase
 triosephosphate dehydrogenase (NADP)

References

Further reading 

 
 
 

EC 1.2.1
NADPH-dependent enzymes
Enzymes of known structure